Javon Alexander Mack (born November 19, 1985) is a former American football center. He played college football for the University of California, Berkeley and was drafted by the Cleveland Browns in the first round with the 21st overall of the 2009 NFL Draft. He also played for the Atlanta Falcons and the San Francisco 49ers.

Early years
Mack was born in Los Angeles, California. He attended San Marcos High School in Santa Barbara, where he was named the Channel League's Co-Most Valuable Player on defense and earned a first-team all-league selection. He was also selected to the All-CIF team. In addition to football, Mack wrestled for four years with the Royals, losing only two matches his senior year and reaching the state final. He was a CIF champion as a junior and a senior.
In the classroom, he compiled a 4.2 GPA and an 1180 SAT score.

Considered a two-star recruit by Rivals.com, Mack chose California over Northwestern and Stanford.

College career

Mack played for the California Golden Bears football team while attending the University of California, Berkeley. He made 39 consecutive starts for the Golden Bears  registering 256 key blocks/knockdowns, 32 touchdown-resulting blocks and 29 down field blocks. Mack compiled a 3.61 undergraduate GPA at the University of California, Berkeley as a legal studies major. He graduated in 2008 and played the 2008 season as a graduate student in education. He won the Draddy Trophy, also dubbed the "academic Heisman", for his academic success in 2008, becoming the first Cal player and the second consecutive center to earn the trophy, following Dallas Griffin of Texas. He also won the Morris Trophy in 2007 and 2008, making him the third offensive lineman and the first since Washington's Lincoln Kennedy in 1991 and 1992 to win the award twice. Mack also represented Cal at the 2009 Senior Bowl.

Professional career

2009 NFL Draft
Projected as a first-to-second rounder by Sports Illustrated, Mack was the highest ranked center available in the 2009 NFL Draft. He was drafted by the Cleveland Browns with the 21st overall selection. He was the first Golden Bears offensive lineman selected in the first round since Tarik Glenn in 1997.

Cleveland Browns
Mack signed a five-year contract with the Browns on July 25. During the 2009 NFL season, Mack started on the Browns offensive line every game. After a shaky start, the Browns line, anchored by Joe Thomas, paved the way to three consecutive 100+ yard games by Jerome Harrison and one game in which Harrison ran for 286 yards, which stands at third all-time in one game.  At the end of the regular season, Mack was selected as center on the All-Rookie team. He started all 16 games, committed only 1 penalty and allowed just 1 sack.

During the 2010 NFL season, Mack again started every game for the Browns. He was named to the 2011 Pro Bowl roster as a second alternate to replace Nick Mangold. During week 5 of the 2011 NFL season, Mack played through appendicitis during a loss to the Tennessee Titans. Mack had an appendectomy during Cleveland's bye week and came back and started against the Oakland Raiders the week after the bye week.

On December 27, 2013, Alex Mack was voted to his first Pro Bowl Selection, after having been added in 2011 to replace an injured player.

On April 9, 2014, it was announced that the Jacksonville Jaguars had offered Mack a five-year contract, worth reportedly $42 million.  The Browns had a maximum of five days to match Jacksonville's offer, which they did on April 11. Mack had been previously assigned the transition tag, nullifying his free agency unless a team signed Mack to an offer sheet. During Week 6 against the Pittsburgh Steelers on October 12, 2014, Mack was carted off the field due to a leg injury. X-rays tested positive that his leg had a broken fibula, forcing Mack out for the rest of the 2014 campaign. Prior to Mack's injury, he had never missed a single snap in his professional career. On  March 2, 2016, Mack voided his contract with the Cleveland Browns thus making him a free agent.

Atlanta Falcons

On March 9, 2016, Mack signed a five-year, $45 million contract with the Atlanta Falcons, including $28.5 million in guaranteed money.

In the 2016 season, Mack and the Falcons reached Super Bowl LI , where they faced the New England Patriots. Mack was the starting center in the game for the Falcons. In the Super Bowl, the Falcons fell in a 34–28 overtime defeat.

On December 19, 2017, Mack was named to his fifth Pro Bowl. On December 18, 2018, Mack was named to his sixth Pro Bowl.

Mack missed Week 16 of the 2020 NFL season due to a concussion, ending a streak of 90 consecutive regular season starts. He was placed on the reserve/COVID-19 list by the team on December 31, 2020, and activated on January 13, 2021.

San Francisco 49ers
On March 18, 2021, Mack signed a three-year contract with the San Francisco 49ers.

On June 3, 2022, Mack retired after 13 seasons in the NFL.

References

External links

Atlanta Falcons bio
Cleveland Browns bio 
California Golden Bears bio

1985 births
Living people
Sportspeople from Santa Barbara, California
Players of American football from California
American football centers
California Golden Bears football players
Cleveland Browns players
Atlanta Falcons players
San Francisco 49ers players
American Conference Pro Bowl players
Unconferenced Pro Bowl players
William V. Campbell Trophy winners
National Conference Pro Bowl players
Ed Block Courage Award recipients